Sigma I-63 was one of the series of Sigma war games. These were a series of classified high level war games played in the Pentagon during the 1960s to strategize the conduct of the burgeoning Vietnam War. These simulations were designed to replicate then-current conditions in Indochina, with an aim toward predicting future foreign affairs events. They were staffed with high-ranking officials standing in to represent both domestic and foreign characters; stand-ins were chosen for their expertise concerning those they were called upon to represent. The games were supervised by a Control appointed to oversee both sides. The opposing Blue and Red Teams customary in war games were designated the friendly and enemy forces as was usual; however, several smaller teams were sometimes subsumed under Red and Blue Teams. Over the course of the games, the Red Team at times contained the Yellow Team for the People's Republic of China, the Brown Team for the Democratic Republic of Vietnam, the Black Team for the Viet Cong, and Green for the USSR.

Preparation for these simulations was quite extensive. A game staff of as many as 45 people researched and developed the scenarios. The actual play of the war game involved 30 to 35 participants. There are four or five simulations per year, solicited secretively from the State Department, the Central Intelligence Agency, and major military commands.

Sigma I-63
See also Battle of Luang Namtha

Sigma I-63 was played in Spring 1963, in the wake of the disastrous Battle of Luang Namtha. In that battle, the Royal Lao Army had run from half its number of communist soldiers in May 1962, and did not stop for 160 kilometers.

Sigma I-63 was held with senior level officials setting policy for the Red and Blue Teams. Working level officials were the actual players. Major participants were members of the incoming Johnson administration; Chairman of the Joint Chiefs of Staff Maxwell Taylor, Deputy Under Secretary for Political Affairs Alexis Johnson, and Under Secretary of Commerce for Economic Affairs George Ball are known players.

Ambassador William H. Sullivan was another participant. His recollection is that Sigma I-63 ended in a fictional 1970 with 500,000 American troops locked in a stalemate in Vietnam, and conscription riots in the United States. According to another account, after the five-day game played out a hypothetical ten year Vietnam War, the North Vietnamese had increased their infiltration into South Vietnam despite the presence of 600,000 U.S. servicemen. U.S. Air Force General Curtis Lemay was infuriated by the game's predicted results.

Despite Sigma I-63's ending, both Secretary of Defense Robert McNamara and Maxwell Taylor predicted that the greatest part of the American mission in Vietnam would be completed by year's end 1965.

See also
 Sigma war games

Notes

References

 Allen, Thomas B. (1987) War Games: The Secret World of the Creators, Players, and Policy Makers Rehearsing World War III Today. McGraw-Hill. ISBNs 0070011958, 9780070011953.
 Conboy, Kenneth and James Morrison (1995) Shadow War: The CIA's Secret War in Laos. Paladin Press. .
 Gibbons, William Conrad (1995) The U.S. Government and the Vietnam War. Princeton University Press. ISBNs 0691006350, 978-0691006352.
 Sorley, Lewis (1998) Honorable Warrior: General Harold K. Johnson and the Ethics of Command (Modern War Studies). University Press of Kansas. ISBNs 0700609520, 978-0700609529.
 Stuart-Fox, Martin, Historical Dictionary of Laos. Scarecrow Press, 2008. ISBNs 0810864118, 9780810864115.

Sigma war games
1963 in military history